Yuranigh (approx. 1820 – April 1850) was an Australian Indigenous guide and stockman. Yuranigh was born in New South Wales and died in New South Wales.

Yuranigh accompanied Thomas Mitchell as an Aboriginal guide on his 1845–46 expedition to central Queensland. Mitchell wrote of him: 

After the expedition, Yuranigh returned to Sydney with Mitchell before relocating to Boree, where he died and was buried by his people. There are four carved trees around the grave site, indicating that Yuranigh was a man of special honour. The trees are believed to be the highest remaining number of carved trees around a single grave.

See also 

 Grave of Yuranigh

References

Australian Aboriginal guides
Australian stockmen
1850 deaths
Year of birth uncertain